Nathalie Brydolf (born 25 April 1995) is a Swedish singer who participated in Idol 2018, broadcast on TV4, placing 6th.

She participated in Melodifestivalen 2021 with the song "Fingerprints".

Discography

Singles

References

1995 births
Living people
Singers from Stockholm
Idol (Swedish TV series) participants
Swedish women singers
Melodifestivalen contestants of 2021